Marques Deon Anderson (born May 26, 1979) is a former American football safety in the National Football League (NFL). He was drafted by the Green Bay Packers in the third round of the 2002 NFL Draft. Anderson also played for the Oakland Raiders, Denver Broncos, and San Francisco 49ers. He graduated from UCLA with a Bachelor of Arts in American Literature and Culture. In 2012, Marques earned his Master of Arts and Social Sciences with a major in Adult Learning and Global Change from Linköpings University in Sweden.

Anderson is the founder and director of the World Education Foundation, currently engaging in international research and development projects.

During his final year, Marques met his mentor and decided to go in a different direction and leave his NFL career to move in a different direction, focusing on international socially responsible business.

In 2011 and 2012 Marques took on the position of Athletic Director and Head Coach for the Norwegian American Football organization Oslo Vikings. The Vikings went on to win league and national championships in both years. In 2012, the Oslo Vikings won league or national titles at every level in the Norwegian series from U-14 to Seniors.

References 

1979 births
Living people
Players of American football from Los Angeles
American football safeties
UCLA Bruins football players
Green Bay Packers players
Oakland Raiders players
Denver Broncos players
San Francisco 49ers players
People from Harbor City, Los Angeles
Players of American football from Long Beach, California